The St. Albert City Council is the governing body of the City of St. Albert, Alberta, Canada. It is composed of a mayor and six councillors, aldermen prior to 2001. All seven members are elected at-large every four years, three years prior to 2013.

Current council

Cathy Heron - Mayor
Ken MacKay - Councillor
Sheena Hughes - Councillor
Wesley Brodhead - Councillor
Natalie Joly - Councillor
Mike Killick - Councillor
Shelly Biermanski - Councillor

2021 results

Previous City Councils

2017–2021
Cathy Heron - Mayor
Wesley Brodhead - Councillor
Jacquie Hansen - Councillor
Sheena Hughes - Councillor
Natalie Joly - Councillor
Ken MacKay - Councillor
Ray Watkins - Councillor

2017 results

2013–2017
Nolan Crouse - Mayor
Wesley Brodhead - Councillor
Cathy Heron - Councillor
Sheena Hughes - Councillor
Cam MacKay - Councillor
Tim Osborne - Councillor
Gilles Prefontaine - Councillor (2013-2016)
Bob Russell - Councillor (2016-2017)

2013 results

2010–2013
Nolan Crouse - Mayor
Len Bracko - Councillor
Wes Brodhead - Councillor
Cathy Heron - Councillor
Roger Lemieux - Councillor
Cam MacKay - Councillor
Malcom Parker - Councillor

2010 results

2007–2010
Nolan Crouse - Mayor
Len Bracko
James Burrows
Lorie Garritty
Gareth Jones
Roger Lemieux
Carol Watamaniuk

2007 results

2004–2007

Paul Chalifoux - Mayor
Len Bracko
Christine Brown
James Burrows
Nolan Crouse
Lorie Garritty
Neil Korotash

2001–2004

Richard Plain - Mayor
Len Bracko
James Burrows
Neil Korotash
Lynda Moffat
Doug Ritzen
Curtis Stewart

1998–2001

Paul Chalifoux - Mayor
Kent Davidson
Margaret Plain
Penny Reeves
Bob Russell
Jim Starko
Carol Watamaniuk

1995–1998

Anita Ratchinsky - Mayor
Ken Allred
Paul Chalifoux
Margaret Plain
Penny Reeves
Bob Russell
Carol Watamaniuk

1992–1995

Anita Ratchinsky - Mayor
Ken Allred
Paul Chalifoux
Kent Davidson
Margaret Plain
Penny Reeve
Carol Watamaniuk

1989–1992

Anita Ratchinsky - Mayor
Ken Allred
Len Bracko
Ray Gibbon
Jerry Manegre
Margaret Plain
Bob Russell

1986–1989

Dick Fowler resigned as mayor in March 1989, and city council selected Ray Gibbon to finish his term.  Gibbon's aldermanic seat was left vacant until the next election.

Jerry Manegre was elected Alderman in a byelection on October 26, 1987 replacing George Kuschminder who resigned earlier in the year.

Dick Fowler - Mayor (Oct '86-Mar '89)
Ray Gibbon - Mayor (Apr-Sep '89)
George Kuschminder (Resigned '87)
Jerry Manegre (Elected Oct 26 '87) 
Margaret Plain
Anita Ratchinsk
Pam Smith
Rod Throndson

1983–1986

Dick Fowler - Mayor
Ken Allred
Roger Ayotte
Liesbeth Bakker
George Kuschminder
Bill Shields
Rod Throndson

1980–1983

Dick Fowler - Mayor
Ken Allred
Roger Ayotte
Liesbeth Bakker
Louise Beland
Bill Shields
Rod Throndson

1977–1980

Ronald Harvey - Mayor
Roger Ayotte
Liesbeth Bakker
Barry Breadner
Bill Shields
Margaret Smith
Rod Throndson

1977

Richard Plain - Mayor
Barry Breadner
Myrna Fife
Frank Lukay
Margaret Smith
Rod Throndson
Garry Wetsch

St. Albert Town Council

The St. Albert Town Council was the governing body of St. Albert, Alberta during its time as a town, which lasted from September 1, 1904 until December 31, 1956 and again from June 27, 1962 until December 31, 1976.  The council was composed of a mayor and six town aldermen.  The frequency of the council's election changed over time.  Initially, the mayor was elected annually with the councillors being elected on staggered two year terms, with three being elected each year.  When St. Albert became a town for the second time, in 1962, provincial legislation dictated instead that the entire council would be elected every three years.

1974–1976

Richard Plain - Mayor
Barry Breadner
Myrna Fife
Frank Lukay
Margaret Smith
Rod Throndson
Garry Wetsch

1971–1974

Ray Gibbon - Mayor
John Bakker
John de Bruijn
Myrna Fife
Robert "Bob" Hudson
Frank Lukay
Rod Throndson

1962–1965

William Veness - Mayor
John de Bruijn
Bernard Montpetit
Ed Powell
Walter Skrobot
David Stewart
Loyd Wheating

See also
List of mayors of St. Albert, Alberta

References

External links
 St. Albert City Council

Municipal councils in Alberta
Politics of St. Albert, Alberta